Dapo Lam Adesina (born 25 October 1978) is a Nigerian politician, who was a member of Nigeria's 8th House of Representatives. He is a member of the All Progressives Congress (APC). He represented Ibadan North East/South East Federal constituency of Oyo State between 2015–2019. He is currently the Special Assistant Political (South West) to the Speaker of the House of Representatives.

Early life

Dapo Lam Adesina was born on 25 October 1978. He began his basic education at Ayodele Nursery and Primary School in Ibadan, he attended the prestigious Government College Ibadan (GCI), he briefly studied Electrical and Electronics Engineering at The Polytechnic, Ibadan (Eruwa Campus), before moving to the premier University of Ibadan where he graduated from the Agricultural and Environmental Engineering department.

Professional career
Dapo Lam advanced his working career in the oil and gas industry, as he was a principal partner in Skipet Oil Nig. Ltd. He's co-founder and president of Future Initiative Nigeria, a platform for the Nigerian youth. He also serves a patron for Federal Road Safety Commission (FRSC RS 11:32) and a member of the advisory board of Youth Advocators Network.

Dapo lam was an intern at Forestry Research Institute of Nigeria (FRIN) and later at Stabillini Visinoni (a sister company of Bi -Courtney Construction Company) in Lagos.
Dapo lam also worked at the Ministry of Agriculture, Enugu State.

Political career

Dapo Lam political career started in 1998 when he was elected as the pioneer secretary, Alliance for Democracy (AD), Youth wing of Ibarapa East local government.
Adesina contested for the same position he presently occupies in 2011 under the defunct Action Congress of Nigeria (A.C.N) but lost.

Dapo lam was later appointed as Commissioner for Youth and Sports in Oyo State by Governor Abiola Ajimobi between August 2011 to September 2013,a position he held and performed exceptionally well as adjudged by series of the landmark achievements he initiated during his tenure before he was redeployed to the Ministry of Industry, Applied Science and Technology in November 2013 to December 2014 .

Dapo lam resigned in 2014, and was elected as the representative for the Ibadan Northeast/south east constituency in the Federal house of representatives in the 2015 elections.

References

External links

 During his interview with African Interviews on Dapo Lam Adesina speaks on how to break into politics
 My dad never wanted me to join politics says Dapo Lam Adesina during his interview with Punch Newspaper in December 2017.
 A profile was made on him by InsideOyo.Com titled  From Felele To Abuja… Story Of Dapo Lam-Adesina At 39.
 Dapo Lam Adesina support the viral Not Too Young To Run Campaign.

Oyo State
Members of the House of Representatives (Nigeria)
Yoruba politicians
Living people
People from Oyo State
1978 births
African Democratic Congress politicians
University of Ibadan alumni